Pumas Tabasco is a Mexican professional football club based in Villahermosa. Founded in 2020, Pumas Tabasco is the official reserve team of Club Universidad Nacional and is part of the Liga de Expansión MX, the second professional football division of the Mexican football league system.

History 
On April 13, 2020, the owners of the Liga MX teams voted to transform the Ascenso MX into a development league, in which these clubs could create a branch team to give experience to youth players. On May 9, the Club Universidad Nacional confirmed that it would have a branch team in the new league.

On June 24, 2020, the arrival of an agreement to establish the team in Villahermosa was announced, the administration of the team is divided into two parts, the operational theme is carried out by local entrepreneurs, while the sports aspect is controlled by Club Universidad Nacional. In addition, it was announced that the team was named Pumas Tabasco. Subsequently, it was announced that the team will only play its matches in Villahermosa, training in Mexico City, in addition, the squad will be based on the Club Universidad Nacional Premier, team that played in Liga Premier de México.

Coaching staff

Players

Current squad

References 

Mexican reserve football clubs
Villahermosa
Football clubs in Tabasco
Association football clubs established in 2020
2020 establishments in Mexico